The Russian spelling alphabet is a spelling alphabet (or "phonetic alphabet") for Russian, i.e. a set of names given to the alphabet letters for the purpose of unambiguous verbal spelling. It is used primarily by the Russian army, navy and the police.  The large majority of the identifiers are common individual first names, with a handful of ordinary nouns and grammatical identifiers also. A good portion of the letters also have an accepted alternative name.

Alphabet
The letter words are as follows:

Numbers

See also
 ICAO spelling alphabet, for Roman letters
 Greek spelling alphabet

References

 

Spelling alphabets
Russian language
Cyrillic script

ru:Фонетический алфавит